The Clove was the first British trade ship to make port in Japan. Captained by John Saris, it landed at Hirado, near Nagasaki, on 12 June 1613.

Saris opened a trading post and factory in Hirado, which he passed on to his colleague Richard Cocks when he left Japan in December that same year. Cocks would manage the post for roughly ten years before he was recalled by the British East India Company on charges of misconduct; he died of illness shortly after leaving Japan.

References
Frederic, Louis (2002). Japan Encyclopedia. Cambridge, Massachusetts: Harvard University Press.

Sailing ships
1613 in Japan
1610s ships